The Global Social Venture Competition (GSVC) provides entrepreneurs seeking to make positive social and environmental advances with $80,000 in seed money mentoring and publicity. Goldman Sachs co-sponsors the competition. Thammasat University in Bangkok is the Southeast Asia partner of the Global Social Venture Competition Southeast Asia Regional (SEA) round. In the competition, new social enterprises present their business models in agriculture, technology, tourism, and education. As of December 2019, the Global Social Venture competition has ceased operations, replaced by a new initiative, Sustainable and Impact Finance (SAIF).

Competition organization 
The competition is made up of three rounds. The first two rounds are organized by GSVC regional partner schools, during which entrepreneurs present the social and financial impact of their business. The final round is organized at the Haas School of Business, UC Berkeley.

Executive Summary Round 
In the Executive Summary Round, teams submit an Executive Summary of their business ideas.

Regional Semi-Final Round 
A select number of plans are chosen to move forward to the Regional Semi-Final Rounds hosted by our Regional Partners. Teams that advance expand their entries to full business plans, and compete in the Regional Semi-Final Rounds.

GSVC Global Finals 
The top two teams from each Regional Semi-Final Round will be selected to compete at the Global Finals at the Haas School of Business, UC Berkeley, which consists of two consecutive rounds. Teams re-submit their business plan and supporting documents. They are given the opportunity to make revisions following the Regional Semi-Finals, for the Global Finals Round.

Winners are announced at the culmination of the Global Finals Round, and prizes are awarded as follows:

 1st place: $25,000
 2nd place: $15,000
 3rd place: $7,500
 People's Choice Award: $1,500
 Quick Pitch Award: $1,000

Regional partners 
 London Business School
 Indian School of Business
 Thammasat Business School, Thailand
 ESSEC Business School, France
 Social Venture Competition Asia
 ALTIS, Postgraduate School of Business and Society, Università Cattolica del Sacro Cuore, Italy
 Youth Innovation China - GSVC China
 Georgia Institute of Technology (Georgia Tech)

Past editions finalists and winners

2017 

 Dr. Noah Toothbrush, South Korea
 Aazer, Egypt
 AMIntegrated Aerial Limited, Nigeria
 Atlas, Italy
 D-Heart, Italy
 GreenMinded, France
 MyH2O, China
 Khyeti, United States/India
 MindRight, United States
 Oishii Farm, United States
 ReBeam Space Inc., Germany
 Ricult, United States
 Roots Studio, United States
 SolarPak, Ivory Coast
 Taqanu, Germany
 Young for Elder, China

2016 

 More Than, South Korea
 Agruppa, Colombia
 Ama’s Pop-Up, Taiwan
 Astraeus Technologies, United States
 Bibak, Italy
 BLITAB, Austria
 Dost, India
 Hygia Sanitation, Thailand
 IntendiMe, Italy
 iTrus, Singapore
 KOPO, United States
 Kwiizi, Cameroon
 Link Accessibility, China
 Otisimo, Turkey
 vChalk, India
 Zéphyr & Borée, France

2015 

 Lumir, South Korea
 Cattle Mettle, India
 Clarus, China
 Drinkwell, United States
 Du’Anyam, Indonesia
 Eco co, Burkina Faso
 Garbage Clinical Insurance, Indonesia
 Gold of Bengal, France and Bangladesh
 Home Stray, China
 Horus Technology, Italy
 Lakheni, South Africa
 Reachi, Denmark
 ReMaterials, United States
 Solwa, Italy
 Toilets for People, United States
 WEDO Global, China
 Xendit, United States
 Y Generation, France

2014 

 Tea Tree, South Korea
 Baisikeli Ugunduzi, Kenya
 CharityStars, Italy
 Chique, Indonesia
 Disease Diagnostic Group, United States
 earthenable, United States
 Keri&Care, France
 Khusela, South Africa
 The Legend of Potatoes, China
 LegWorks, United States
 Odyssey Sensors
 Redeem, Taiwan
 RejuvenEyes, India
 SwissLeg, Switzerland
 Sampurn(e)arth, India
 Smart Pill Box, China
 SocialGiver, Thailand
 Wakati, Belgium

2013 

 AtRium, South Korea
 BrainControl, Italy
 Carbon Roots International, Haiti
 CSA Munching Box, Thailand
 Damascus Fortune, India
 E-Lamp, China
 Essmart, United States/India
 Faso Soap, Burkina Faso
 Jorsey Ashbel Farms (JAF), Burkina Faso
 Pedius, Italy
 PulpWorks Inc, United States
 Reel Gardening, South Africa
 Sunshine Library Rural Digital Education Initiative, China
 TOHL, United States/Chile
 Vi-Care, India
 Wedu, Thailand
 WOOF, Hong Kong

2012 

 2VIDAS, United States
 BM TEAM, China
 COINCYCLE, South Korea
 Exygen, Kenya
 FASOPROT, Burkina Faso
 GREENOVATION TECHNOLOGIES, Bangladesh
 INBELLY, Sweden
 LULAWAY, South Africa
 MAPABILITY, Italy
 MARINE GIFTS, Vietnam
 MICRO OASIS, Indonesia
 SNEWFLY, China
 SPILL, United States
 STATION ENERGY SERVICES, France
 WATSI, United States

2011 

 Beti Halali, Burkina Faso
 DeepScan, Thailand
 Edumile.org, United States
 FINDG One Drop, South Africa
 IKAWA, United Kingdom
 IziWasha, South Africa
 MAGNiVY, Indonesia
 Next Drop, United States
 PAANI, Bangladesh
 Prakti Design, France
 Sanergy, USA
 SMILE Floss, Thailand
 Solar Light Pillow Project, United States
 Tilapiana, United States
 Tree Planet, Korea

2010 

 Amandes, Indonesia
 AYZH, India
 Bags of Hope, China
 Blue Drop, United States
 C-Crete Technologies, USA
 Free hap, Thailand
 Makane, France
 Nest For All, France/United Kingdom
 Ruma, USA
 W induction, United Kingdom
 Re:Motion Designs, USA

2009 

 EcoFaeBrick, Indonesia
 Bright Mind Labs, New Zealand
 m Pedigree Logistics, United States
 Solar Cycle, USA

2008 

 MicroEnergy Credit Corporation, United States
 Bio Power Technology, Indonesia
 BioVolt, USA
 SMART - Sustainable Marine Adventures and Responsible Tourism, Thailand

2007 

 Feed Resource Recovery, United States
 d.light design, USA
 Revolution Foods, USA
 Verdacure, Thailand
 Cool2Care, UK

2006 

 Mobile Medics, USA
 Advanced Transit Enterprises, USA
 The Highland Tea Company, United States
 One-world Medical Devices, USA

2005 

 Connect US, United States
 Fuelture, USA/United Kingdom
 Fuerza Research, United States
 Human Service Fellowship, USA
 Micro Credit Enterprises, USA
 World of Good, USA

References

External links
Global Social Venture Competition website 

Entrepreneurship organizations